The 1928 United States presidential election in Minnesota took place on November 6, 1928 as part of the 1928 United States presidential election. Voters chose 12 electors, or representatives to the Electoral College, who voted for president and vice president.

Minnesota was won by the Republican candidate, Secretary of Commerce Herbert Hoover won the state over Democratic Party candidate, New York governor Al Smith by a margin of 164,526 votes, or 16.94%. Nationally, Hoover won the election, with 444 electoral votes and a landslide 17.41% lead over Smith in the popular vote.

A Republican presidential nominee would not carry Minnesota again until Dwight D. Eisenhower did so in 1952. This was also the last presidential election held in Minnesota before the elimination of the 10th congressional district, and hence the last presidential election in which Minnesota had 12 electoral votes. , this is the last election in which Carlton County and St. Louis County voted for a Republican presidential candidate.

This was the last election as of 2020 in which both Otter Tail County and Lake County voted for the same candidate. In 1932, Otter Tail would back Franklin Roosevelt and then vote for every ensuing Republican while Lake would be the sole Minnesota county to back Hoover's re-election bid before rapidly becoming one of the most Democratic counties in the state and never voting Republican again.

Results

Results by county

See also
 United States presidential elections in Minnesota

Notes

References

1928
Min
1928 Minnesota elections